Palaeostomatidae is a family of echinoderms belonging to the order Spatangoida.

Genera:
 Ditremaster Munier-Chalmas, 1885
 Heterobrissus Manzoni & Mazzetti, 1878
 Palaeostoma Lovén, 1872
 Palaeostoma Wright, 1868
 Sarsiaster Mortensen, 1950
 Trachyaster Pomel, 1869

References

Spatangoida
Echinoderm families